Mallard Island is a small island in Suisun Bay, at the confluence of the Sacramento and San Joaquin rivers. It is part of Contra Costa County, California. It appears in a 1953 USGS map of the area.

References

Islands of Contra Costa County, California
Islands of the Sacramento–San Joaquin River Delta
Islands of Northern California